Frans Vihtori Härmä (15 September 1881 – 3 January 1962) was a Finnish school director and politician, born in Tyrvää. He was a member of the Parliament of Finland from 1922 to 1929, representing the National Coalition Party. He was the mayor of Pori from 1929 to 1947.

References

1881 births
1962 deaths
People from Sastamala
People from Turku and Pori Province (Grand Duchy of Finland)
Members of the Parliament of Finland (1922–24)
Members of the Parliament of Finland (1924–27)
Members of the Parliament of Finland (1927–29)
Mayors of places in Finland
University of Helsinki alumni